Subaltern may refer to:
Subaltern (postcolonialism),  colonial populations who are outside the hierarchy of power
Subaltern (military), a primarily British and Commonwealth military term for a junior officer
Subalternation, going from a universal proposition to a particular proposition in logic
"A Subaltern", the author listed in William Cobbett's "The Soldier's Friend"

See also
Subaltern studies